Achille Octave Marie Jacques Bardoux (27 May 1874 – 15 August 1959) was a French politician.

In the 1930s the Comité des forges published the Bulletin de la société d'études et d'information, edited by Émile Mireaux and then by Jacques Bardoux.
Bardoux served as a member of the French Senate from 1938 to 1944, and as a member of the National Assembly from 1945 to 1955, representing Puy-de-Dôme.

References

1874 births
1959 deaths
People from Versailles
Politicians from Île-de-France
National Centre of Independents and Peasants politicians
French Senators of the Third Republic
Senators of Puy-de-Dôme
Members of the Constituent Assembly of France (1945)
Members of the Constituent Assembly of France (1946)
Deputies of the 1st National Assembly of the French Fourth Republic
Deputies of the 2nd National Assembly of the French Fourth Republic
Commandeurs of the Légion d'honneur